Télégraphe is a station on line 11 of the Paris Métro in the 19th and 20th arrondissements. It is named after the nearby rue de Télégraphe, which was once a chemin de ronde (a raised protected walkway behind a battlement) of the park of the Château de Ménilmontant. Its name comes from the optical telegraph invented by  Claude Chappe (1763–1805) in 1792.  This was the first practical telecommunications system, but was eventually replaced by the electric telegraph. Chappe installed the relay station, containing the telegraph's apparatus which he called a tachygraphe, on this peak of 128 meters altitude.

History 
The station opened as part of the original section of the line from Châtelet to Porte des Lilas on 28 April 1935.

On 1 April 2016, half of the nameplates on the station's platforms were temporarily replaced by the RATP as part of April Fool's Day, along with 12 other stations. It was humorously renamed "#TWEET" , a reference to the evolution of text messaging in the 21st century and as a tribute to Twitter.

As part of modernization works for the extension of the line to Rosny-Bois-Perrier in 2023 for the Grand Paris Express, the station was closed from 8 June 2019 to 15 July 2019 to raise its platform levels and its surface tiled to accommodate the new rolling stock that will be used (MP 14) to accommodate the expected increase passengers and to improve the station's accessibility. An additional entrance will also added at the corner of rue de Belleville and rue du Docteur Potain and will be equipped with a lift.

In 2019, the station was used by 1,823,734 passengers, making it the 257th busiest of the Métro network out of 302 stations.

In 2020, the station was used by 1,194,040 passengers amidst the COVID-19 pandemic, making it the 220th busiest of the Métro network out of 305 stations.

Passenger services

Access 
The station has 3 entrances:

 Entrance 1: rue du Télégraphe
 Entrance 2: rue de Belleville
 Entrance 3: Cimetière de Belleville

Station layout

Platforms 
The station has a standard configuration with 2 tracks surrounded by 2 side platforms. The station's tracks are separated by a supporting wall to strengthen the station box as it is built in soft ground. Due to the significant depth of the platforms, certain landings between flights of stairs that led to the mezzanine level were equipped with seats for travellers to rest. This was removed during the station's renovation and modernisation as part of the "Un métro + beau" programme by the RATP on 28 June 2016. This feature still exists at Buttes Chaumont.

Other connections 
The station is also served by lines 20 and 60 of the RATP bus network, and at night, by lines N12 and N23 of the Noctilien bus network.

Gallery

References

Roland, Gérard (2003). Stations de métro. D’Abbesses à Wagram. Éditions Bonneton.

Paris Métro line 11
Paris Métro stations in the 19th arrondissement of Paris
Paris Métro stations in the 20th arrondissement of Paris
Railway stations in France opened in 1935